There's One in Every Crowd is the third studio album by Eric Clapton. Recorded shortly after 461 Ocean Boulevard, the album features a style similar to its predecessor but did not enjoy similar commercial success.

Background and release
After the success of "I Shot the Sheriff", Clapton and his backing band went to Jamaica to record There's One in Every Crowd. The songs "Swing Low, Sweet Chariot", "Little Rachel" and "Don't Blame Me" are recorded in a reggae style, though the rest of the record is considered blues and rock. However, with his growing alcohol dependency and drug problems in Jamaica, the record was very challenging to record. Clapton wanted the album title to be "World’s Greatest Guitar Player (There's One in Every Crowd)". RSO didn't like the first part and chose to release the album under the shortened title.

Chart performance
The album reached the Top 40 on three national music charts. Achieving the highest position, number 15, in the United Kingdom, the album was certified with a silver disc by the British Phonographic industry. In the United States, the album peaked at position 21. In New Zealand the album placed itself on number 24 on the official New Zealand music chart, compiled by the Recording Industry Association of New Zealand at the time.

Critical reception

AllMusic critic William Ruhlmann awarded the album two out of five possible stars, stating that Clapton "hadn't had time to write or gather sufficient material [after the release of 461 Ocean Boulevard] to make a similarly effective album, since the result is a scattershot mixture of styles". Ruhlmann goes on in his review, noting the "album's best track, naturally, was the blues cover, Clapton's take on Elmore James' 'The Sky Is Crying'". and calling the release "a disappointing follow-up to 461 Ocean Boulevard". Robert Christgau rated the album with a "C+". Augustin Schmidt from the German daily newspaper Frankfurter Allgemeine Zeitung said that the album, compared to 461 Ocean Boulevard, which charted high in Germany the year before, is disappointing, but not so bad, when you ignore the commercial success of the 1974 release.

Track listing

Personnel 
 Eric Clapton – lead vocals, electric guitar, acoustic guitar, dobro, arrangements (1, 2)
 Dick Sims – Hammond organ, acoustic piano, Fender Rhodes
 Albhy Galuten – synthesizers
 George Terry – electric guitar, acoustic guitar, group vocals
 Carl Radle – electric guitar, bass guitar
 Jamie Oldaker – drums, percussion
 Yvonne Elliman – lead vocals, group vocals
 Marcy Levy – group vocals

Production 
 Producer – Tom Dowd
 Engineers – Graeme Goodall, Carlton Lee and Ronnie Logan (Kingston); Don Gehman, Steve Klein and Karl Richardson (Miami).
 Front Photography – Henry DeChatillon
 Back Photography – Robert Ellis
 Inner Sleeve Drawing – Eric Clapton

Chart positions

Weekly charts

Certifications

References

External links

Eric Clapton albums
1975 albums
RSO Records albums
Reggae albums by English artists